The Sleeping Woman is a name or nickname for certain mountain formations located in different places in the world that are said to look like a reclining or deceased woman in the local tradition.

Ranges by the name of "The Sleeping Lady"
Western United States (in all three cases, the nickname is associated with an apocryphal Native American legend of "The Sleeping Lady"):
Mount Susitna, near Anchorage, Alaska
Mount Timpanogos, near Provo, Utah
Mount Tamalpais, near San Francisco, California.
Algeria: Mount Chenoua, according to local tradition the mountain range looks like a reclining pregnant woman.
Cambodia: Phnom Kong Rei.
Chile, in the Andes, Valle del Maipo Chile.
China: 
Sleeping Beauty Range (睡美人山) near Kunming.
Sleeping Beauty, Danxia near Shaoguan city.
Leonidio, in Arcadia, Peloponnese Greece.
Martinique: Morne Larcher (Larcher Hill) called " la femme couchée" (the sleeping woman) is located in Diamant, Martinique.
Mexico: Iztaccíhuatl
Norway: Den Sovende Dronning (The Sleeping Queen), also known as Skjomtind, a mountain range near Narvik, Norway.
Pakistan: Kohat valley mountain. A Mountain called 'Sleeping Beauty' is also located in Quetta, Pakistan.
Panama, La India Dormida (The Sleeping Indian Woman) in El Valle de Anton.
Peru, La Bella Durmiente (The Sleeping Beauty) in Tingo María 
Philippines: Sleeping Beauty, mountain in Kalinga province, northern Philippines.
Taiwan: Mount Guanyin, in New Taipei City Taiwan.
Thailand: 
Doi Nang Non in the Daen Lao Range, northern Thailand.
Khao Nang Non in Nakhon Si Thammarat province, southern Thailand.

Similarly named mountains
La Noyée (drowned lady). A mountain range seen from Notre-Dame-des-Monts, Quebec. Local legend says the mountains are the silhouette of a Native American woman who drowned while swimming across Lac Nairne to meet her lover.
La Mujer Muerta (the dead woman). A mountain range located in the Sistema Central, Spain. Highest point La Pinareja, 2197 m.
Turó de la Dona Morta (Dead Woman hill), a mountain near Maçanet de la Selva, Catalonia, Spain
 Jebel Musa (Morocco) the mountain is also known as The Dead Woman, because from the direction of Ceuta, around the town of Benzú, it resembles a woman on her back.
 The Virgin Gorda; Spanish for the fat virgin, as the island looks like an overweight woman lying on her side.

Ranges by the name of The Sleeping or the Dead Lady

See also
Breast-shaped hill
Dead woman
Northumberlandia

Further reading
 Dixon, Ann. (1994). The Sleeping Lady. Anchorage, AK : Alaska Northwest Books.  (hardbound)  (paperback)
 
 Skolnick, Sharon. (1989). Dreams of Tamalpais. San Francisco: Last Gasp.

References

Named The Sleeping Lady